Hawk Pride Mountain is a summit in Colbert County, Alabama, in the United States.

Hawk Pride Mountain takes its name from the local Pride family of settlers.

References

Landforms of Colbert County, Alabama
Mountains of Alabama